Katerina Lehou or Katerina Lechou (Greek: Κατερίνα Λέχου) is a Greek actress who has been in many theatrical plays, films, and Greek television series.

Biography 
Lehou was born on September 5, 1967, in Athens, Greece. During her childhood, she participated in the arts, like playing the piano and reading literature. She studied and graduated from the Theater of Arts Karolos Koun.

In 1990, Lehou started acting professionally in a film named The scars of the night (Τα σημάδια της νύχτας). In 2010, she began starring on a television series called The island, based on the novel by Victoria Hislop. Viewers were really surprised by Lehou's dramatic performance, since they were used to her starring in comedy serials that she had previously been in.

Lehou participated in the Olympic torch lighting ceremony in Greece for the 2018 Winter Olympics.

Filmography

Film 
 Ta Simadia tis Nyhtas (1990)
 Oxygene (2003)
 Aystiros Katallilo (2008)
 Akalyptos (2013)

Television

Theatre 
 Το τέλος μιας σχέσης (To telos mias sxesis) (2003)
 Ο θάνατος και η κόρη (O Thanatos kai i kori) (2010)

References

External links

Greek actresses
Living people
1967 births
Actresses from Athens